The Lola T89/50 is an open-wheel formula race car chassis developed by British manufacturer Lola, for use in the International Formula 3000 series, a feeder-series for Formula One, in 1989. It was later converted into a closed-wheel sports prototype race car, and used in the European Interserie, between 1994 and 1995.

References 

Open wheel racing cars
International Formula 3000
Lola racing cars